Retiboletus ornatipes, commonly known as the ornate-stalked bolete or goldstalk, is a species of bolete fungus in the family Boletaceae. Originally named Boletus ornatipes by American mycologist Charles Horton Peck in 1878, it was transferred to Retiboletus in 2002.

One guide lists the species as inedible, while another says it is choice.

References

External links

Boletaceae
Fungi described in 1878
Fungi of North America
Taxa named by Charles Horton Peck